"Yellow River" is a song recorded by the British band Christie. It was released in 1970 and became a No. 1 hit song for the band in the UK.

Background
The song was written by the leader of Christie, Jeff Christie. It was first offered to The Tremeloes, who recorded it with the intention of releasing it as a single early in 1970.  However, after the success of their then most recent single, "(Call Me) Number One", and after considering it too pop-oriented for their future direction, they decided to follow it up with another of their own compositions, "By the Way", which was only a minor Top 40 success.

Producer Mike Smith therefore took their vocals off the recording and added Jeff Christie's. Released on 23 April 1970, it became an international hit, reaching number one on the UK Singles Chart for one week in June 1970. In the US, it reached number 23 on the Billboard Hot 100.

The actual location of Yellow River in this song is not specified, although the author, Jeff Christie, is on record as saying that it was inspired by the idea of a soldier going home at the end of the American Civil War. As the song was released during the Vietnam War, it has been interpreted as being about a soldier leaving the U.S. Military at the end of his period of conscription.

Chart performance

Weekly charts
Christie

Jigsaw cover

Year-end charts
Christie

Jigsaw

Other versions

"Yellow River" has spawned a host of cover versions by artists as diverse as R.E.M., Leapy Lee, Elton John, The Compton Brothers, Middle of the Road, Chris Rea, Bernd Spier, Doyle Lawson and Quicksilver, Mayada, and Joe Dassin (his cover named "L'Amérique" reached No. 1 in France).

In Australia, Christie's version of Yellow River gained only limited airplay due to the 1970 radio ban. Local bands Jigsaw from Melbourne and Autumn from Sydney both had success with cover versions.

In the USSR, the band Singing Guitars (Поющие гитары) used the melody of Yellow River paired with the words to a Russian children's song called Fat Karlsson.

See also
List of number-one hits of 1971 (Mexico)

References

1970 songs
1970 debut singles
UK Singles Chart number-one singles
Number-one singles in Norway
Number-one singles in Finland
Irish Singles Chart number-one singles
Christie (band) songs
The Compton Brothers songs
Joe Dassin songs
CBS Records singles
Epic Records singles
Number-one singles in Mexico
Songs about rivers
Song recordings produced by Mike Smith (British record producer)